Preliminary Research Aerodynamic Design to Lower Drag, or Prandtl-D was an unmanned experimental glider-aircraft developed by NASA. The acronym is a reference to early German Aerospace Engineer Ludwig Prandtl.

The Prandtl-D was a tailless glider that is based on the flight of birds. Birds turn and bank without vertical tails that are required for such maneuvers on traditional aircraft. It was intended to provide for future low drag and experimental aircraft designs, which previously have had issues of controllability. The program reinforced similar wing designs by Ludwig Prandtl which were conceptualized a century before. The Prandtl-D's designs were also based on glider concepts of German brothers Reimar and Walter Horten and incorporate the conclusions of NASA aerodynamics pioneers R.T. Jones and Richard T. Whitcomb.

The Prandtl-D1 and the Prandtl-D3 models were featured in the National Air and Space Museum and the California Science Center, respectively.

Albion Bowers, NASA Armstrong chief scientist and Prandtl-D project manager, brought together the theories and has led the effort with help from student interns. He believes that with the concepts proven under the Prandtl-D "the time may be coming for a new paradigm in aviation."

Development 

The first full sized model of these to fly was designated "Prandtl-D No. 3", and flown in a series of tests on October 28, 2015 at the Armstrong Flight Research Center in Edwards, California. The aircraft is centered around the testing of yawing without a vertical stabilizer. The manager of the project, Albion Bowers, said that the aircraft is based on the flight of a bird. 

The Prandtl-D No. 3 first flew Oct. 28, 2015, with double the wingspan of the earlier versions, however, through development, the team managed to reduce the final glider's drag by 11%. 

Initially, each aircraft was radio operated with a hobby-grade controller and launched with a bungee cord system. Later flight tests switched from a bungee launch method to a towed launch system.

The first two vehicles of the program showed twist of the airfoil in providing an bell shaped lift distribution instead of the elliptical distribution. This feature gave an efficiency boost and reduced strain on the wings.

In March 2016, Bowers published a technical paper entitled, “On Wings of the Minimum Induced Drag: Spanload Implications for Aircraft and Birds,” NASA/TP – 2016-219072. Detailing the aerodynamic properties and mathematics associated with the project, Bowers discusses in depth the science behind altering the span load distribution on aircraft wings and the data gathered from experiments that demonstrated validation of its critical principles.

Influence 
The Prandtl-D led to the Preliminary Research Aerodynamic Design to Land on Mars (Prandtl-M) program designed for Mars Exploration. It has been tested in upper atmosphere of Earth and is designed to take topographic photos of the Martian surface.

It also has provided a valuable platform for the Weather Hazard Alert and Awareness Technology Radiation Radiosonde Glider (WHAATRR) that will be used for atmospheric weather testing on Earth.

Museum aircraft 
In 2019, two of the aircraft, D1 and D3, were transferred to the Smithsonian National Air and Space Museum in Washington, D.C., and California Science Center, Los Angeles, respectively, for their display following a successful review of the program. The Smithsonian specifically requested the aircraft because of its innovative proverse-yaw design.

Specifications 

The first two subscale Prandtl-D aircraft had a 12.5-foot wingspan and were constructed of a machined foam core wrapped in a skin of carbon fiber. The Prandtl-D No.3 has a wingspan of 25 ft, weight of 28 lbs, top airspeed of 18 kt, and a maximum altitude of 220 ft. The aircraft also has the Arduino flight control system used in the second Prandtl-D subscale model and is constructed of carbon fiber, fiberglass and foam. A key difference in the Prandtl-D full scale model is an addition of a University of Minnesota developed Data Collection System (DAC).

List of vehicles 

 Prandtl-D1
 Prandtl-D2
 Prandtl-D3
 Prandtl-D3c

References

External links 
 “On Wings of the Minimum Induced Drag: Spanload Implications for Aircraft and Birds,” NASA/TP – 2016-219072.

NASA
2010s United States experimental aircraft
Glider aircraft
Unmanned aerial vehicles of the United States
Aircraft first flown in 2015
Tailless aircraft